Brian Roche (born 2000) is an Irish hurler who plays for Cork Championship club Bride Rovers and at inter-county level with the Cork senior hurling team. He usually lines out as a centre-forward.

St Colman’s College, Fermoy 

Roche enjoyed much success during his tenure as a student at St. Colman's College, Fermoy.
After winning the Cork Colleges U16A Hurling County title in third year. Roche stepped up to represent both the Colleges Junior and Senior teams in his 4th year “transition year”. He was appointed captain of the Junior team along side his twin brother Eoin in the 2016/17 campaign. A team primed with 14 transition year students on the starting 15 would win the school its first Dean Ryan Cup U16.5A Munster Colleges Hurling Championship title after a stunning replay win over a talented Thurles CBS outfit ended 2-12 to 1-13. This win was hugely important for the Colleges ambitions to return to the top table as it was a first Dean Ryan Cup success since the 2002/03 school year when boarders were still part of the Colleges teams. 
Roche central to the Dean Ryan Success from midfield forced his way onto the Dr Harty Cup starting side of 2016/17. The College avenged Semi Final heartbreak from the year prior 2015/16, and would reach the penultimate stage after a 1-08 to 0-07 defeat of fierce rivals Midleton CBS in the Semi Final stages. This all the more impressive as St Colman’s would win a trilogy of encounters over the Imokilly hurling nursery at Senior level that year after a first round Harty Cup win 2-15 to 1-14 was followed up by a Dr O’ Callaghan Cup Final loss 0-11 to 0-10. A huge achievement with that  Midleton CBS outfit the defending Rice Cup, White Cup and Dean Ryan Cup winners never losing in Munster up to Harty level and tipped as favourites for the Harty title that year. Roche lined out at Full Forward on a young St Colman’s outfit boasting 4 transition year students in the starting 15 in the Dr Harty Cup Final which fell short to Our Ladys Templemore on a scoreline of 2-22 to 1-06.

Honours

Bride Rovers
Cork Premier 2 Under-21 Hurling Championship (0): Runners-Up 2019

St Colman’s College, Fermoy
Dean Ryan Cup 2016/17 Winner 
Dr Harty Cup 2016/17 Finalist 

Cork
All-Ireland Under-20 Hurling Championship (1): 2020
Munster Under-21 Hurling Championship (1): 2018
Munster Under-20 Hurling Championship (1): 2020
Munster Minor Hurling Championship (1): 2017
All-Ireland Under-17 Hurling Championship (1): 2017
Munster Under-17 Hurling Championship (1): 2017 (c)

References

2000 births
Living people
Bride Rovers hurlers
Cork inter-county hurlers